Wat Niwet Thammaprawat Ratchaworawihan is a Buddhist temple (wat) of the Dhammayut Order, located within the grounds of the Bang Pa-In Royal Palace in Thailand's Phra Nakhon Si Ayutthaya Province. Founded in 1878, it is remarkable among Thai Buddhist temples in that its architecture mimics that of a European church, being built in the Gothic Revival style.

History
The construction of Wat Niwet Thammaprawat was commissioned by King Chulalongkorn (Rama V) in 1876, to serve as the royal temple for the newly expanded Bang Pa-In Palace. The temple was designed by Joachim Grassi, one of the first Italian architects employed under the king's government. Many public buildings were built in the Western style during Chulalongkorn's reign, a trend reflecting the modernisation of Siam (as Thailand was then known) at the time. Wat Niwet Thammaprawat was built in Gothic Revival style, with stained glass windows and a Gothic altar. Its appearance resembles that of a Christian church, with the temple's main Buddha image in place of a Cross. Construction was completed in 1878.

Status and location
Wat Niwet Thammaprawat is a royal temple, first-class, of the ratchaworawihan type, and is one of the sixteen temples which receive annual royal kathina offerings. It falls under the Dhammayut Order of Thai Theravada Buddhism. It is a registered historic monument, and received the ASA Architectural Conservation Award in 1989.

The temple is located on an island of the Chao Phraya River, next to Bang Pa-in Royal Palace, in Ban Len Subdistrict, Bang Pa-in District, Phra Nakhon Si Ayutthaya Province. It is nowadays accessible by a cable car from the palace.

See also
 Buddhism in Thailand
 Holy Redeemer Church, Bangkok - a Catholic church built in Thai style

References

External links

Buddhist temples in Phra Nakhon Si Ayutthaya Province
Gothic Revival architecture in Thailand
1878 establishments in Siam
19th-century Buddhist temples
Thai Dhammayut Buddhist temples
Buildings and structures on the Chao Phraya River
Registered ancient monuments in Thailand